Emmet Granville Campbell (June 1, 1887 – January 29, 1929) was a baseball first baseman in the Negro leagues. He played with the Homestead Grays in 1918 and 1921 and the Pittsburgh Keystones in 1922. He is also listed as Joe Campbell in some sources.

References

External links
 and Baseball-Reference Black Baseball stats and Seamheads

Homestead Grays players
Pittsburgh Keystones players
1887 births
1929 deaths
Baseball first basemen
Baseball players from Illinois
20th-century African-American people